Sawa, Hama is a Syrian village located in the Subdistrict of the Hama District in the Hama Governorate. According to the Syria Central Bureau of Statistics (CBS), Sawa had a population of 546 in the 2004 census.

References 

Populated places in Hama District